St. Lambert's Church (in German: St Lamberti-Kirche) is the main Evangelical Lutheran church in the centre of the city of Oldenburg, Lower Saxony, Germany.

Overview
The church is named after Lambert of Maastricht. The church is the preaching venue of the bishop of the Evangelical Lutheran Church in Oldenburg.

The church dates from the 13th century and was renovated in the 19th century. It was originally built as a Romanesque hall between 1155 ad 1234. Subsequently, it was altered several times. The outside hides a rotunda-style basilica, based on the Pantheon in Rome.

To the north is the old Rathaus (city hall). To the southeast is Schloss Oldenburg.

Gallery

See also
 List of visitor attractions in Oldenburg

References

External links

 360° panorama by the church

Oldenburg Lamberti
Lamberti
Lamberti
Oldenburg Lamberti
Lamberti
Oldenburg Lamberti
1150s establishments in the Holy Roman Empire
1155 establishments in Europe
Oldenburg Lamberti
Oldenburg Lamberti
Churches completed in 1234